Tardush Shad — was a Yabghu of Tokharistan. He was a son of Tong Yabgu Qaghan.

Reign 
In 618 or 625 Tong Yabgu invaded Tokharistan and forced Hephtalite principalities to submit. According to Cefu Yuangui, these principalities were Zabulistan, Kapisa-Gandhara, Khuttal, Chaghaniyan, Shignan, Shuman, Badhgis, Wakhan, Guzgan, Bamiyan, Kobadiyan and Badakhshan, when Pantu Nili - a later yabgu of Tokharistan submitted to Tang. He installed his son Tardu in Kunduz to rule over with title of Tokharistan Yabgu.

Family and death 
He was married two times - both a daughter of Qu Boya (麴伯雅) - ruler of Gaochang. When Xuanzang visited Kunduz, he also brought a letter from his brother-in-law and ruler of Gaochang Qu Wentai (麴文泰) to Tardu. Yabgu received him despite being in ill condition. It was Tardu to advise him to make a trip westward to Balkh (modern Afghanistan), to see the Buddhist sites and relics. Xuanzang also witnessed a palace scandal when Tardu's firstborn son Ishbara Tegin fallen in love with his new step-mother (also aunt) and poisoned Tardu in 630.

References 

7th-century Turkic people
630 deaths
Ashina house of the Turkic Empire
History of Kunduz Province
Turkic Buddhist monarchs